Professor John B. West FRCP (born 1928) is a respiratory physiologist who made major research contributions in the area of ventilation-perfusion relationships in the lung. He led a medical research expedition to Mount Everest in 1981, which investigated the influence of altitude and exertion on human physiology.

Early life and education
West was born in Adelaide, Australia in 1928. He graduated in medicine (M.B.B.S., 1952) from the University of Adelaide, Australia. Subsequently he was awarded M.D. (1959) and D.Sc. (1980) degrees from the same university.

Career
West worked at Hammersmith Hospital in London in 1960 and received his Ph.D. degree from London University in the same year.

As a physiologist, he joined Sir Edmund Hillary's 1960–61 Silver Hut expedition, a scientific and mountaineering expedition to the Himalayas. After working as a postdoctoral fellow with Hermann Rahn at Buffalo in 1961-62, he returned to London as Director of the Respiratory Research Group at Postgraduate Medical School (1962–1967) and was promoted to University Reader there in 1968.

After sabbatical leave at the NASA Ames Research Center at Moffett Field, California in 1968, he was invited to join the faculty of the new School of Medicine at the University of California at San Diego as professor of medicine and physiology. Since it was first published in 1974, his book Respiratory Physiology: the Essentials (Lippincott Williams & Wilkins) has become the most widely used introductory text in respiratory physiology. It has been translated into at least 17 languages.

He was a member of the NIH Cardiovascular and Pulmonary Study Section from 1971–1975, and chairman from 1973–1975; a member of the Physiology Committee of the National Board of Medical Examiners (1973–1976); and a member of the Cardiopulmonary Council of AHA (1977–78).

After election to membership in American Physiological Society in 1970 and to Council in 1981, in 1983 he became president elect, and became the 57th APS President for 1984-85.

In 1981, he led the 1981 American Medical Research Expedition to Mount Everest. For NASA he has been chairman of the Science Verification Committee for Spacelab in 1983 and a member of their Advisory Committee on Scientific Uses of Space Station in 1984. Also in that year he served as a member of a NAS Committee on Space Biology.

Awards
Awards include:
 Josiah H. Macy, Jr., Foundation Scholar, in 1974
 Ernst Jung Prize for Medicine in Hamburg, West Germany, in 1977
 Presidential Citation of the American College of Chest Physicians in 1977
 Kaiser Award for Excellence in Teaching in 1980
 University of California, San Diego, Revelle Medal 2018

He has held nearly twenty endowed lectureships, including
 the Wiltshire Memorial Lectureship at King's College, London (1971); 
 the Brailsford Robertson Memorial Lectureship at Adelaide University (1978); 
 the Brompton Annual Lectureship at Brompton Hospital, London (1979); 
 the Harveian Lectureship in London (1981); 
 a Centenary Lectureship at Auckland, New Zealand (1983); and
 Telford Memorial Lectureship at Manchester University in England (1983).

References

 John B West biography at APS

External links
 John B. West Papers MSS 444. Special Collections & Archives, UC San Diego Library.
 

1928 births
High-altitude medicine physicians
Australian physiologists
Living people
Alumni of the University of London
Foreign Members of the Russian Academy of Sciences
People from Adelaide
University of Adelaide Medical School alumni
Members of the National Academy of Medicine